Marcin Adamski  (born 20 August 1975 in Świnoujście) is a Polish professional footballer.

Career

Club
In 2002, he joined SK Rapid Wien. In January 2005, he was loaned to Angers SCO on a half year deal.

In June 2005, he signed again a contract with SK Rapid Wien. He was released by Rapid Wien at the end of season 2005–06.

In September 2006, he signed a one-year contract with FC Erzgebirge Aue.

In January 2008, he moved to ŁKS Łódź. Six month later he extended his contract for four years.

National team
Adamski has made three appearances for the Poland national football team.

References

External links
 
 

1975 births
Living people
People from Świnoujście
Polish footballers
Poland international footballers
Polish expatriate footballers
Warta Poznań players
Zagłębie Lubin players
ŁKS Łódź players
SK Rapid Wien players
Angers SCO players
FC Erzgebirge Aue players
Expatriate footballers in Austria
Expatriate footballers in France
Expatriate footballers in Germany
Ekstraklasa players
Austrian Football Bundesliga players
2. Bundesliga players
Ligue 2 players
Sportspeople from West Pomeranian Voivodeship
Association football defenders